Thankful is the first extended play by American pop group New Kids on the Block, released on May 12, 2017. "One More Night" was issued as the first single on March 7, 2017, and premiered live on The Late Late Show with James Corden on March 6, 2017.

On December 1, 2017, the band published an expanded edition of the EP, called Thankful (Unwrapped), which included the original EP plus the Target bonus track with DMX (now available digitally/streaming), as well as three newly recorded holiday songs: "Unwrap You", "One Night of Peace", and "December Love."

Track listing

Notes
 "Still Sounds Good" contains portions of "99 Luftballons", written by Jörn-Uwe Fahrenkrog-Petersen and Carlo Karges.

Charts

References

2017 debut EPs
New Kids on the Block albums